Hasni Kuh (also Romanized as Ḩasnī Kūh; also known as Ḩasī Kūh) is a village in Shuil Rural District, Rahimabad District, Rudsar County, Gilan Province, Iran. At the 2006 census, its population was 18, in 5 families.

References 

Populated places in Rudsar County